Alec McHoul (born 14 June 1952) is a British-Australian academic. He has written numerous books and articles, many of which are informed by ethnomethodology.
He is currently Emeritus Professor at Murdoch University. McHoul was born in Wallasey, a town on the Wirral Peninsula, England. In 1973 he graduated from the University of Lancaster, with a Bachelor of Arts (Hons) in Literature and Linguistics and, in 1974, a Master of Arts. In 1975 he moved to Australia. In 1978 he was awarded a Doctorate from the Australian National University.

Criticism and Culture
McHoul's work spans a range of academic fields such as linguistics, cultural theory, continental philosophy and literary theory. Critics have noted McHoul's approach to diverse subjects wherein he is seen as adhering to no strict rule of academic enquiry. Whether McHoul should or, indeed, can work with one set of analytical tools in order to cover such a diverse range of social phenomena is not entirely clear among critics of his work. Robert Eaglestone, for example, offers the following critique of McHoul's' Semiotic Investigations: Towards an Effective Semiotics: 'The book is no less … an attempt to work in at least three fields at once, and McHoul seems at home dealing with analytic philosophy, continental philosophy, semiotics, and linguistics'. Douglas Ezzy says, 'His [McHoul's] theoretical range is wide, drawing on Wittgenstein, Saussure, ethnomethodology [and] phenomenology'.. McHoul appears to stray from an unwritten set of academic norms when he uses whatever is at-hand to get the job done: to be a social commentator and to understand, in an era of intellectual self-reflection, that the commentary itself is social. In short, then, McHoul takes A posse ad esse (as far as this is attainable), confusing his peers, perhaps, but clearly winning some applause in terms of his willingness to utilize the ideas of others, no matter how dissimilar those ideas might appear.

While McHoul's post-structuralist (or Renaissance-esque; see also polymath) approach is hardly new, one would not expect that his (or anybody else's) work can adhere to any singular theory; rather, his usage of ideas allow him to question notions of 'Culture' from a variety of perspectives - notably, by paying attention to its interlocutors - the major players. In short, McHoul might ask where the idea of Language stops and the design of a lecture theatre, say, begins; indeed, he might ask the question: what part does either play in everyday life and, importantly, specific cultures?

Having said this, it would come as no surprise that McHoul's 1998 Popular Culture and Everyday Life, looks at Food and Eating, Sport, Self-Help/Therapy, and Talking. Each chapter deals briefly with potentially cultural acts; it is not enough to merely talk about or for a culture, but to add a natural extension to that talk in the form of actions. In this way, every human endeavour becomes a potential avenue for opening up discussions on what is meant and what is at stake when the idea of Culture is discussed in the humanities.

The Decline of Communication Studies
In a 2007 interview published in Metro Magazine, McHoul discusses the advent and demise of Communication Studies as a 'rather massive and amorphous thing [that] bred all of these other things and basically became nothing in its own right.' In order to explain his ideas on, and interest in, Film Studies, McHoul highlights the gradual, forced disintegration of Communication Studies due to the growth of its 'amoeba-like entities' such as Mass Communication and Public Relations. It is here that McHoul points out that with ever-decreasing government funding the rubric of Communications Studies was not marketable to international students for whom many universities relied upon for revenue.

Discourse Analysis
With the idea that members of a community/culture dictate the rules of social interaction via specific languages, McHoul seeks to identify what he sees as the 'problem of culture'. He says, for example, 'A culture is, in fact, where we recognize what you are doing because, for all of us, culturally, that is how we would do it.' In his critique of Cultural Studies McHoul goes on to say, 'culture is only a problem of connecting production ('generating') and consumption ('recognising') when it is speculatively treated as a spectacular field in which cultural objects are always considered as representing something beyond them (such as gendered, economic, or racial 'patterns').'

Work

Bibliography

Edited Work

Translation

For a full list of publications, see also: http://wwwmcc.murdoch.edu.au/mchoul/

References

Alumni of Lancaster University
1952 births
Living people
British sociologists
Australian sociologists